Dwight Schar is an American businessman.  He is the founder of NVR, Inc., a Fortune 500 company that is the third-largest home builder (by revenue) in the United States. He currently serves as the company's Executive chairman and Chairman of Executive Committee. Schar was also a minority owner of the Washington Commanders of the National Football League from 2003 to 2021, as well as the former financial chairman for the Republican National Committee.

Background
Schar grew up in rural northeast Ohio and graduated from Norwayne High School in 1960.  He then attended Ashland University (then Ashland College) in Ashland, Ohio, where he majored in education.  After graduating from Ashland in 1964, Dwight began teaching, and on the weekends, he had a job selling homes. Schar soon left teaching to pursue a career in home building. In 1980, Schar founded his own company, NVHomes, which eventually acquired his former employer, Ryan Homes, in 1987; the company was thus renamed NVR. NVR lost billions of dollars and was forced to declare Chapter 11 bankruptcy in 1992.

Political involvement
Along with his involvement in the Republican National Committee, Schar is also a well-known financial supporter of the Republican Party and numerous Republican candidates, making contributions through his company as well as private contributions from both his McLean, VA home and his home in Palm Beach, FL. In 1989, Virginia Republican gubernatorial candidate Marshall Coleman was backed financially by Schar. An investigation from the Richmond Times-Dispatch had discovered that one of Schar's companies had issued loans through the Virginia Housing Development Authority.

In both the 2000 and 2004 Bush-Cheney presidential campaigns, Schar was not only a donor, but also a major fundraiser.  In the 2000 campaign, Schar was a Bush "pioneer", the distinction given to those committed to raising $100,000 or more for the campaign.  In the 2004 re-election campaign, Schar rose to the new level of "Ranger," raising $200,000 or more.

In 2003 Schar, along with Robert Rothman and Frederick W. Smith, purchased a minority share of the Washington Redskins, an American football franchise belonging to the National Football League. The three owned a total of 40% of the team until 2021, when they sold their stake to majority owner Dan Snyder following discontentment with Snyder.

Congressional letter and investigation 
Ryan Homes, a business under the NVR umbrella, received a letter from Senator Sherrod Brown (D-OH) which asked the company to stop the practice of forced arbitration. Three senators joined in and asked that both Ryan Homes and NVR "remove the arbitration provisions from their agreements and stop requiring homebuyers to sign non-disclosure agreements in order to resolve disputes." USA Today conducted an investigation that found that Ryan Homes "ignored warranty requests for dozens if not hundreds of customers nationally."

Class-action lawsuit 
A lawsuit filed by homeowners in Bella Collina, a community run by DCS Capital Investments, accused Paul Simonson, Randall Greene, and Richard Arrighi of "racketeering, embezzling and conspiracy." The lawsuit stated that the homeowner's association (HOA) should have been turned over to the homeowners instead of DCS Capital Investments; it was dismissed by a federal court a year later.

Philanthropy

In 2006, Schar donated $5 million to his alma mater, Ashland University, to help fund the construction of their new education building.  The university named the new building "Dwight Schar College of Education" in his honor. In May 2016, he donated $10 million to George Mason University's school of policy, government, and international affairs, the school was renamed the Schar School of Policy and Government in his honor.

In 2019 he donated $50 million to establish the pediatric oncology-focused cancer treatment center at Inova Fairfax Hospital, which was named the Inova Schar Cancer Institute.

References

1942 births
American billionaires
Living people
Ashland University alumni
American real estate businesspeople
Ohio Republicans
Virginia Republicans
Florida Republicans
People from Creston, Ohio
Businesspeople from Ohio
Businesspeople from Virginia
Businesspeople from Florida
20th-century American businesspeople
21st-century American businesspeople
Washington Redskins owners
Washington Football Team owners
21st-century philanthropists
Philanthropists from Ohio
Philanthropists from Virginia
Philanthropists from Florida